Geoffrey Eli Bodine (born April 18, 1949) is a retired American motorsport driver and bobsled builder. He is the oldest of the three Bodine brothers (with Brett Bodine and Todd Bodine), and sister Denise. Bodine lives in West Melbourne, Florida.

Bodine's racing career seemed to be on track right from the start as his father and grandfather, Eli Bodine Jr. and Sr. built Chemung Speedrome just a year after he was born. He began learning his racing skills at this track in the micro-midget division when he was only five years old. He had such an itch to race that he disguised himself as a lady and entered an event known as the Powder Puff Derby when he was 15.

NASCAR Modified driver
Bodine was an accomplished driver before he hit the big-time in NASCAR's premier division, the Winston Cup Series, with his first start in 1979. By this time, Bodine was well known as a Modified driver in the Northeast, racing against popular drivers like Richie Evans, Jerry Cook, Jimmy Spencer, Ron Bouchard, and others. Bodine earned Modified championships at Stafford Speedway, Shangri-La Speedway, Spencer Speedway, and Utica-Rome Speedway. He has won many of the big races in Modifieds including the Lancaster 200 (1978, 1981), Race of Champions (1972 – Trenton), the Stafford 200 (1978), the Trenton Dogleg 200 (1979), the Thompson 300, the Spring Sizzler (1980 – Stafford Speedway), Oswego Classic (1981), Cardinal Classic (1975 – Martinsville Speedway), Oxford 250 (1980, 1981), and other modified events.

In 1978, Bodine won more races than any other Modified driver in recorded history. Driving cars owned by Dick Armstrong with Billy Taylor and Ralph Hop Harrington as crew chief, Bodine started 84 feature events and won 55 of them. Among the most prestigious of these victories were the Race of Champions at Pocono, the Spring Sizzler at Stafford, the Budweiser 200 at Oswego, both major events at Martinsville, the Thompson 300, and a sweep of the six-race Yankee All-Star League series.  For these fifty-five victories, Bodine is credited in the Guinness Book of World Records with "Most wins in one season".

Bodine's racing background also included wins in the Late Model division, Nationwide Series division, and others.  He has six Busch Grand National wins to his credit.

NASCAR Winston Cup career

Bodine is best known for his NASCAR Winston Cup career, and in his first full season in Winston Cup came in 1982 he earned the Rookie of the Year title. His first Winston Cup pole that year on his 19th start (1982 Firecracker 400) and scored his first Winston Cup victory two years later on his 69th start at Martinsville in 1984. This win was also the first win for Hendrick Motorsports, which was the team Bodine was racing for at the time. Bodine's biggest win came at the 1986 Daytona 500, NASCAR's premier event. Other career highlights include the 1987 International Race of Champions championship, the 1992 Busch Clash, the 1994 Winston Select (despite a first segment spinout), and the 1994 Busch Pole Award (now Budweiser Pole Award). Bodine's final win in NASCAR's highest division came in the "Bud At The Glen" in August 1996 when fortuitous pit stop timing led to him taking the lead in his QVC Thunderbird while the other drivers pitted. Bodine managed to hold off the field the rest of the way beating Terry Labonte to the line by 0.44 seconds to claim victory.

Cup career highlights

After a few tumultuous years in Winston Cup, Bodine saw his career launch off the ground when he ran the #5 car for Hendrick Motorsports. He spent over 28 years in the sport, with his most successful years being between 1984 to 1996. Bodine has driven for some of the best car owners in NASCAR, including Junior Johnson, Bud Moore and Rick Hendrick as well as owning his own cars, which he ran for several seasons after buying the assets of Alan Kulwicki's race team after his death in 1993. He has 565 starts, 37 poles, 18 wins, and nearly $16 million in winnings during his Winston Cup/Nextel Cup career. He was honored as one of "NASCAR's 50 Greatest Drivers" during NASCAR's 50th anniversary celebration.  Bodine has always been a great innovator and brought many ideas to Winston Cup.  He introduced power steering and full-faced helmets to Winston Cup. He was also the last driver to win a race and lap the field, in the fall 1994 race at North Wilkesboro Speedway. He holds the track record at Atlanta Motor Speedway from his polesitting run after the track was repaved in 1997, with a speed of over 197 mph.

Rivalry with Dale Earnhardt
During the late 1980s, Bodine and seven-time Winston Cup champion Dale Earnhardt became embroiled in a rivalry. An incident in the 1987 running of The Winston triggered harsh feelings when Earnhardt knocked Bodine and Bill Elliott out of the way to win the $200,000 purse. NASCAR later fined Bodine $1,000 and put him on probation for three weeks. Six days later, the rivalry intensified when Bodine tagged Earnhardt in a Busch Grand National Series race at Charlotte Motor Speedway. Bodine and team owner Rick Hendrick claimed the wreck was unintentional, but NASCAR disagreed, fining Bodine another $15,000 and extending his probation to the end of 1987. Bodine later appealed and the penalty was revoked.

At the same Busch race in 1988, Earnhardt spun Bodine, and the New Yorker later retired from the race, later going over to Earnhardt's Cup car and drawing an "X" in the air over the car with his hand. The following day, while being passed by Bodine in the 1988 Coca-Cola 600, Earnhardt wrecked Bodine's car, leading NASCAR to assess a five-lap penalty on Earnhardt. Bodine's car owner, Rick Hendrick, claimed the penalty was too light, while Earnhardt's car owner Richard Childress thought the penalty was too harsh. Two days later, officials from the sanctioning body brought both drivers and car owners together for a meeting in Daytona Beach, Florida, where all involved parties settled their disputes.

Bodine would later say, in a 2015 article with the Racing Experts website, that he and Earnhardt were friends and got along well in their early racing days. They had dinner parties and their children played with each other. However, when both drivers joined the NASCAR Winston Cup Series, their relationship changed, and they grew distant from each other. By the time the rivalry had begun, both drivers were at the prime of their careers, which partly contributed to the heated incidents with each other. Although the rivalry was put to an end by the NASCAR dinner meeting, both teams, and Bodine still have a difference of opinion on who was mostly responsible for it.(6)(7)

Daytona crash

While competing the inaugural Daytona 250 Truck Series race at Daytona International Speedway, on February 18, 2000, Bodine was involved in a vicious, fiery accident on the 57th lap of the race while driving the No. 15 Ford F-150 for Billy Ballew.

The crash started when then-rookie Kurt Busch, Rob Morgan, and Lyndon Amick were racing three-wide through the tri-oval front straightaway. In the exact moment Bodine moved to get around the outside of the trio, Morgan was turned across Busch's nose into the side of Amick's truck, who was at the bottom. Amick's truck was damaged in the contact, which caused it to veer hard right, pushing Morgan into Bodine who was on the outside.

The force of the impact completely tore the front of the truck into pieces and ruptured its fuel cell, leaving only small parts of the roll cage intact. Just as Bodine was coming back down to the track, it was hit driver's side by Lonnie Rush, Jr., which caused it to roll down the frontstretch. As it tumbled, it got hit yet again, this time by Jimmy Kitchens, which ignited the fuel that was spilling out of the tank. Bodine rolled nine times before coming to rest on his roof. The accident was so severe, the announcers, crew members and fans all believed that Bodine had been killed. Thirteen other trucks were involved, making it one of the largest wrecks in NASCAR Truck Series history. As a result of the collision, Bodine suffered fractures in his right wrist, right cheekbone, a vertebra in his back, and his right ankle; he also suffered a concussion. Kitchens was also hospitalized after his contact with Bodine. However, he suffered no serious injuries. Nine spectators were also injured in the crash.

Incredibly, Bodine missed only ten races of the 2000 Winston Cup season while recovering from his injuries, returning at Richmond International Raceway on May 6 and finishing 13th in a 400-lap race. However, Bodine's struggles over the ensuing months led to his dismissal from the team in September. In a feat of great accomplishment, he returned in the 2002 Daytona 500 to finish third behind race winner Ward Burton and second-placer finisher Elliott Sadler. However, including that race, Bodine only managed to make 18 starts in the NASCAR Cup Series between 2001 and 2004, with only one Top 5 and two Top 10's both in 2002. He attempted to qualify for the 2004 Brickyard 400 driving for Gary Trout Autosports, but was unable to and made no more attempts at any other races that year.

Racing twilight
Geoff, brother Todd, and Larry Gunselman started a race team in 2009. Geoff attempted to qualify the No. 64 Toyota for the 2009 Daytona 500. In 2010, Geoff returned to the Camping World Truck Series for the first time since 2004 with Team Gill Racing at Atlanta. He finished 26th with engine problems despite qualifying an impressive 8th. In 2011, he drove for Tommy Baldwin Racing in the Sprint Cup Series, alternating between the Nos. 35 and 36 teams, with sponsorship from Luke & Associates.

Retirement
In October 2012, Bodine announced through TheRacingExperts.Com that he was retiring from NASCAR after 27 seasons. Bodine said he wanted to spend time with his family and do charitable deeds.

In June 2012 he opened a Honda Power Sports dealership in West Melbourne, Florida, where he currently resides.

As of August 2014, Bodine is a Driver Analyst for The Racing Experts, the website that announced his retirement in 2012. He is a contributing columnist with articles published monthly.

Bo-Dyn bobsleds

Bodine is the co-owner of the Bo-Dyn Bobsled Company. His bobsled interest came about while watching the 1992 Winter Olympics when the U.S. Bobsled team was having a tough time during competition. Bodine learned that the sleds being used were all imported and not built domestically. He felt that he could help the team win with better technology derived from his race car experience, engineering background, as well as the abundant design and construction resources offered to him through his NASCAR connections. With his interest captured, Bodine took a few runs in a bobsled at Lake Placid to confirm his feelings and to learn more about the sleds.

Bo-Dyn Bobsleds (Bo for Bodine, "Dyn" for Chassis Dynamics) was created in 1992 by Bodine and his good friend and chassis builder, Bob Cuneo of Chassis Dynamics. Bodine founded the USA Bobsled Project to help create a winning bobsled for the U.S. teams. The U.S. National Team first used their sleds in 1994. Ten years after Bo-Dyn's inception, the U.S. team won three medals in Bo-Dyn Bobsleds during the 2002 Winter Olympics in Salt Lake City, and during the 2010 Winter Olympics in Vancouver, British Columbia, American bobsledder Steven Holcomb piloted a Bo-Dyn Bobsled named "Night Train" to gold. Every January from 2006 to 2010 at the Lake Placid, New York track, a charity run is held with the US bobsled team and NASCAR drivers to raise money for the sled project. Participants have included Todd Bodine (one of Bodine's brothers) and Tony Stewart.

Motorsports career results

NASCAR
(key) (Bold – Pole position awarded by qualifying time. Italics – Pole position earned by points standings or practice time. * – Most laps led.)

Sprint Cup Series

Daytona 500

Busch Series

Camping World Truck Series

International Race of Champions
(key) (Bold – Pole position. * – Most laps led.)

References 

6. My relationship with Dale Earnhardt, Retrieved from, https://theracingexperts.com/geoffs-journal-my-relationship-with-earnhardt-php

7. Dale Jr. Download: Richard Childress’ fighting advice: ‘Always take off your watch’, https://nascar.nbcsports.com/2019/04/09/dale-jr-download-richard-childress-fighting-advice-always-take-off-your-watch/

External links

 
 
 
 Geoff Bodine Fan Club
 NASCAR.com article announcing the Modified all-time Top 10
 
 Bo-Dyn Bobsled Project
 Geoff's Journal

1949 births
Living people
International Race of Champions drivers
NASCAR drivers
NASCAR team owners
People from Chemung, New York
People from West Melbourne, Florida
Racing drivers from New York (state)
Hendrick Motorsports drivers
Bodine family